Michael Robert Van Valkenburgh (born September 5, 1951) is an American landscape architect and educator. He has worked on a wide variety of projects in the United States, Canada, Korea, and France, including public parks, college campuses, sculpture gardens, city courtyards, corporate landscapes, private gardens, and urban master plans.

Life and career

Early years and education
Michael Van Valkenburgh was born on September 5, 1951, and grew up in Lexington, New York, where his family owned a small dairy farm. Van Valkenburgh received a Bachelor of Science from the College of Agriculture at Cornell University in 1973, studied photography at the School of the Museum of Fine Arts, Boston, from 1974 to 1975, and earned a Master of Landscape Architecture from the College of Fine Arts at University of Illinois at Urbana-Champaign in 1977. He worked at Carr, Lynch, Associates, Inc., in Cambridge, Massachusetts, from 1979 until 1982, when he founded his own firm, Michael Van Valkenburgh Associates, Inc. In the early years of his practice, Van Valkenburgh specialized in seasonally dynamic hedge gardens and ice walls. He received a grant from the National Endowment for the Arts which allowed him to experiment with ice as a material in landscape design. In 1988, Van Valkenburgh received the Rome Prize from the American Academy in Rome.

Teaching career
Van Valkenburgh is the Charles Eliot Professor of Practice, Emeritus at the Graduate School of Design at Harvard University. His career at the GSD began in 1982; he served as program director from 1987 to 1989, and as Chairman of the Department of Landscape Architecture from 1991 to 1996.

Design approach and inspiration
Van Valkenburgh describes his work as an exploration of the living qualities of the landscape medium and an attempt to emancipate landscape architecture from a its traditionally subsidiary relationship to architecture. His designs are based on a sensitivity to the particular qualities of each project site and thus do not necessarily resemble one another with respect to form, details, or imagery. According to fellow landscape architect James Corner, Van Valkenburgh's work demonstrates "that the knowledge of a place derives more deeply through experience of material, time, and event, than through visuality alone, and that landscape experience is fuller and more profound when it accrues through inhabitation than through the immediacy of the image or the objectification of the new."

As an architect, he has been influenced by his upbringing in an agricultural setting and his education at Cornell University during the 1970s—in particular his exposure to Ian McHarg's ground-breaking book Design with Nature. Van Valkenburgh has been recognized for his ability to successfully integrate new methods of sustainable design and ecological renewal into the experience of the places he designs, making sustainability part of the beauty of a place that educates visitors and raises environmental awareness.

Crediting artist Robert Smithson's writings on Frederick Law Olmsted and the "landscape dialectic" as a source of inspiration, Van Valkenburgh's landscapes are sometimes completely original explorations of naturalism and the constructed urban landscape (for instance, Teardrop Park and Brooklyn Bridge Park) but he has also completed many sensitive historic landscape restorations including Harvard Yard; Marion Square in Charleston, South Carolina; and several works at Wellesley College. According to landscape theorist Anita Berrizbeitia, in her introduction to a book of essays on the work of MVVA, "His parks and public open spaces are based on the conviction that not only can the power of nature and the power of the man-made coexist, but they are the better for doing so."

Van Valkenburgh approaches his designs in such a way that the spirit of place is at the forefront and the center of the design. To create a space that reflects the desired future for an area and give it a spirit of hope and progress requires a lot of foresight to the desired effect.  Van Valkenburgh designs his projects in a way that reflect the desired future of the area in the spirit of the place they are striving for. His projects often begin with ordinary places that he is able to rejuvenate into a place that cause people to look past what it was and instead look to the future of the park as well as the surrounding city because of the spirit of the place Michael Van Valkenburgh has instilled in the space with his adaptive reuse of this post industrial wasteland and his intentional intertwining of it with nature.

Michael Van Valkenburgh Associates, Inc.
Founding Michael Van Valkenburgh Associates, Inc. (MVVA) in 1982, he currently leads the firm with five fellow principals: Laura Solano, Matthew Urbanski, Paul Seck, Gullivar Shepard, and Emily Mueller De Celis. The firm has 100 employees and two offices, in Cambridge, Massachusetts and Brooklyn, New York. MVVA has completed a broad range of landscape design, construction, and restoration projects in both the public and private realms. To date, MVVA has completed over 350 projects, and has cultivated an expertise in sustainability, soil toxicity, and waterfront infrastructure. The firm collaborates frequently with artists, including Maya Lin, Ann Hamilton, Martin Puryear, Mel Bochner, Meg Webster, and Oscar Tuazon.

Awards
His practice has won many national awards for their designs, including 19 from the American Society of Landscape Architects. These awards include:

 For Allegheny Riverfront Park, in Pittsburgh, Pennsylvania:
 1997 Progressive Architecture Awards citation, Architecture Magazine
 2002 Design Merit Award, ASLA
 2002 Place-Making Award, Places Magazine/Environmental Design Research Association
 For Brooklyn Bridge Park, in Brooklyn, New York:
 2009 Analysis & Planning Honor Award, ASLA
 2009 Waterfront Plan Honor Award, WaterFront Center
 2010 "Designing the Parks" Honor Award, National Park Service
 2011 Rudy Bruner Award for Urban Excellence (silver medal), Bruner Foundation
 For the master plan for the Lower Don Lands, in Toronto, Ontario:
 2007 Toronto Urban Design Award, City of Toronto
 2008 Analysis & Planning Honor Award, ASLA
 2008 Special Jury Award for Sustainable Development, Royal Architectural Institute of Canada
 2009 International Award for Best Futuristic Design, Building Exchange Summit
 2010 Transportation Achievement Award, Institute of Transportation Engineers
 2011 Excellence in Planning Award, Ontario Professional Planners Institute
 For Teardrop Park, in Battery Park City, New York City, New York:
 2009 General Design Honor Award, ASLA
 2010 "Designing the Parks" Honor Award, National Park Service
 For the restoration of Harvard Yard, at Harvard University, in Cambridge, Massachusetts:
 1993 Planning & Urban Design Merit Award, ASLA
 1994 Honor Award, National Trust for Historic Preservation
 For work at Wellesley College, in Wellesley, Massachusetts:
 1999 Planning & Analysis Merit Award, ASLA (for the campus master plan)
 2006 General Design Award of Excellence, ASLA (for Alumnae Valley)
 1989 Design Honor Award, ASLA, for the Regis Garden, at the Walker Art Center in Minneapolis, Minnesota
 1990 Design Merit Award, for the Black Granite Garden in Los Angeles, California
 1998 Design Merit Award, ASLA, for the Vera List Courtyard, at The New School in New York City, New York
 2002 Design Merit Award, ASLA, for Spider Island, at the Chicago Botanic Garden in Glencoe, Illinois
 2004 Design Merit Award, ASLA, for the Garden on Turtle Creek, in Dallas, Texas
 2005 Design Honor Award, ASLA, for the Herman Miller Factory landscape, in Cherokee County, Georgia
 2006 Design Honor Award, ASLA, for Tahari Courtyards, in Millburn, New Jersey
 2008 Design Honor Award, ASLA, for the Smith Family Waterfront Park, at the Boston Children's Museum in Boston, Massachusetts
 2008 Residential Design Honor Award, ASLA, for the Nomentana Garden, in Stoneham, Maine
 2010 Design Honor Award, ASLA, for the Lake Whitney Water Treatment Facility landscape, in New Haven, Connecticut

Recent accomplishments

Michael Van Valkenburgh continues to devote himself to design work and teaching. He has a National Council of Landscape Architectural Registration Board certification and is a registered Landscape Architect in twenty different states. In 2002, he was a speaker in the Spotlight on Design Lecture Series at the National Building Museum. In 2003, Van Valkenburgh served on the selection jury of the World Trade Center Site Memorial Competition and won the National Design Award for Environmental Design from the Smithsonian Institution's Cooper-Hewitt National Design Museum. In November 2004, Van Valkenburgh was personally thanked by First Lady Laura Bush for his design for the renovation of Pennsylvania Avenue in Washington, D.C. In 2007, Van Valkenburgh was asked to present the Rutgers Department of Landscape Architecture Margaret O. Cekada Memorial Lecture. In 2010, he was awarded two major prizes: the Arnold W. Brunner Memorial Prize in Architecture, from the American Academy of Arts and letters, for contributions to architecture as an art, and the Brendan Gill Prize from the Municipal Arts Society of New York City, which recognized Brooklyn Bridge Park as the work of art that best captured the spirit and energy of New York City.

Publications

Books

Designing a Garden: Monk's Garden at the Isabella Stewart Gardner Museum, Michael Van Valkenburgh, essay by Laurie Olin, Monacelli Press, 2019 
Foreword, Taking Measures Across the American Landscape (by James Corner and Alexander S. MacLean), New Haven, CT: Yale University Press, 1996.
Design with the Land: Landscape Architecture of Michael Van Valkenburgh, Princeton Architectural Press, 1994
Gertrude Jekyll: A Vision of Garden and Wood (with Judith B. Tankard), Sagapress, 1989.
The Flower Gardens of Gertrude Jekyll and Their Twentieth-Century Transformations, Design Quarterly 137, MIT Press for the Walker Art Center, 1987.
Transforming the American Garden: 12 New Landscape Designs (with Margaret B. Reeve, and Jory Johnson), Cambridge, MA: Harvard University Graduate School of Design, 1986
Built Landscapes: Gardens in the Northeast, Brattleboro Museum & Art Center, 1984

Articles

"Built Landscapes, Ecologies and Re-defining 'Preservation'", CRM: The Journal of Heritage Stewardship, National Park Service, v.7, n.2, Summer 2010
"Faculty project: Teardrop Park [Battery Park City, New York]", Harvard Design Magazine, n.12 (Fall 2000), pp. 92–93
"Ein Hof mit Streifen", Garten + Landschaft, v.106, n.2 (Feb. 1996), pp. 26–28
"Restoring The Harvard Yard Landscape", Arnoldia, Spring 1994 (with Peter Del Tredici)
"Conceiving a Courtyard", Places, Spring 1990 (with Carol Doyle Van Valkenburgh)
"Best laid plan: Gertrude Jekyll's brilliant planting and Edwin Lutyen's architectural mastery make Hestercombe a superb example of collaborative garden design". House & garden, v.161, n.3 (Mar. 1989), pp. 150–157 (with Carol Doyle Van Valkenburgh)
"The Flower gardens of Gertrude Jekyll and their twentieth-century transformations" Design Quarterly, no.137 (1987), pp. 1–30
"Notations of nature's process", Landscape Architecture, v.76, no.1 (Jan.-Feb. 1986), pp. 40–45
"Two Views of Landscape Design: A.E. Bye and Dan Kiley," Orion Quarterly, Spring 1985.
"Built Landscapes at Wave Hill," New York Times, August 11, 1984.
"Ice: To Freeze on Walls," Landscape Architecture, January 1984.
"Illusion of Space," Garden Design, Vol. 1, No. 1 (March 1982).
"Garden Spot for Half a House," Landscape Architecture, March 1981.
"Principles for the Design of a Mixed Use Development in Kendall Square, Cambridge, Massachusetts," Cambridge Redevelopment Authority, October 1978.
"Grade School Children's Use of and Attitudes about Two Play Areas in Carle Park, Urbana, Illinois," Proceedings of the Ninth Conference of the Environmental Design Research Association, Washington, D.C., April 1978.

Publications about Michael Van Valkenburgh and MVVA

Amidon, J., Michael Van Valkenburgh/Allegheny Riverfront Park: Source Books in Landscape Architecture, Princeton Architectural Press, 2005
Berrizbeitia, A., Michael Van Valkenburgh Associates: Reconstructing Urban Landscapes, Yale University Press, 2009
Blum, A., "The Active Edge", Metropolis, March 2006
Gilette, J., "Michael", Landscape Architecture Magazine, Feb. 1998
Werthmann, C., Green Roof - A Case Study: Michael Van Valkenburgh Associates' Design for the Headquarters of the American Society of Landscape Architects, Princeton Architectural Press, 2007
Mitani, T., "American Landscape Architecture", Space Design (Japan), Summer 1998

Notable works

Completed

 Regis Garden, Walker Art Center, Minneapolis, Minnesota, 1988
 Radcliffe Ice Walls, Harvard University, Cambridge, Massachusetts, 1988
 Garden on Lake Minnetonka, Wayzata, Minnesota, 1989
 Krakow Ice Garden, Martha's Vineyard, Massachusetts, 1990
 Pucker Garden, Brookline, Massachusetts, 1990
 General Mills Sculpture Garden, Minneapolis, Minnesota, 1991 (destroyed 2000)
 Jardin des Tuileries, Paris, France, 1991
 Mill Race Park, Columbus, Indiana, 1993
 50 Avenue Montaigne Courtyard, Paris, France, 1993
 Oakville Park Completion, Oakville, Ontario, 1993
 Ho-Am Art Museum and Sculpture Garden, Seoul, South Korea, 1993
 Vera List Courtyard, The New School, New York City, New York, 1997
 Allegheny Riverfront Park, Pittsburgh, Pennsylvania, 1998
 Garden on Turtle Creek, Dallas, Texas, 1999
 Spider Island, Chicago Botanic Garden, Glencoe, Illinois, 2000
 Herman Miller Factory Landscape, Cherokee County, Georgia, 2001
 Marion Square, Charleston, SC, 2002
 Straightsview Farm, San Juan Island, Washington, 2003
 Harvard Yard Restoration, Harvard University, Cambridge, Massachusetts, 2003
 Peabody Essex Museum landscape, Salem, Massachusetts, 2003
 Tahari Courtyards, Millburn, New Jersey, 2003
 Kraus Campo, Carnegie Mellon University, Pittsburgh, Pennsylvania, 2003
 Renovation of Pennsylvania Avenue at the White House, Washington, D.C., 2004
 Nomentana Garden, Stoneham, Maine, 2005
 Alumnae Valley, Wellesley College, Wellesley, Massachusetts, 2005
 Lake Whitney Water Treatment Plant, New Haven, Connecticut, 2005
 Green Roof, ASLA Headquarters, Washington, D.C., 2006
 Bailey Plaza, Cornell University, Ithaca, New York, 2007
 Smith Family Waterfront Park, Boston Children's Museum, Boston, Massachusetts, 2007
 Union Square North End Plaza and Playground, New York City, New York, 2010
 Segment 5 (Piers 62–64), Hudson River Park, New York City, New York, 2010
 BJC Institute of Health Plaza (with Maya Lin), Washington University in St. Louis, St. Louis, Missouri, 2010
 Teardrop Park, Battery Park City, New York City, New York, 2010
 Corktown Common, Toronto, Ontario, 2011
 Penn Park, University of Pennsylvania, Philadelphia, Pennsylvania, 2011
Charles B. Hayes Family Sculpture Park, Snite Museum of Art, 2013
 Gateway Arch National Park, St. Louis, Missouri, 2018
 Gathering Place: Tulsa Riverfront Park, Tulsa, Oklahoma, 2018

In progress

 Brooklyn Bridge Park, Brooklyn
 Rijnhavenpark, Rotterdam, The Netherlands
 George W. Bush Presidential Center landscape, Dallas, Texas
 York Quay, Toronto, Ontario
 Brooklyn Botanic Garden renovation, Brooklyn, New York
 Maggie Daley Park, Chicago, Illinois
 Lower Don Lands, Toronto, Ontario
 Waller Creek, Austin, Texas
 Hudson Park and Boulevard, New York City, New York
 Dorothea Dix Park, Raleigh, North Carolina

Competition Wins

 Pennsylvania Avenue at the White House, Washington, D.C., 2002 (completed)
 Lower Don Lands Design Competition, Toronto, 2007, (in progress)
 The City + The Arch + The River Competition, Gateway Arch National Park, St. Louis, Missouri, 2010 (to redesign the grounds around the Gateway Arch), (in progress)
 ARC Wildlife Crossing Competition (with HNTB), Denver, Colorado (in progress)
 Waller Creek Competition, Austin, Texas, (in progress)

References

External links
MVVA Profile
Harvard GSD Faculty Page

1951 births
American landscape architects
Cornell University College of Agriculture and Life Sciences alumni
Harvard Graduate School of Design faculty
University of Illinois College of Fine and Applied Arts alumni
Living people